This is a list of governors of Cairo Governorate, the most populous of the Governorates of Egypt, since 1952.

Governors from 1952–present

See also
 Cairo Governorate

References

External links
; (in Arabic)

Cairo Governorate
History of Cairo